Town of Brisbane was an electoral district of the Legislative Assembly in the Australian state of Queensland from 1860 to 1873.

Taking in areas of Brisbane north of the Brisbane River, it was a three-member constituency and one of the original sixteen districts contested at the first colonial election in 1860.

Members for Town of Brisbane

See also
 Electoral districts of Queensland
 Members of the Queensland Legislative Assembly by year
 :Category:Members of the Queensland Legislative Assembly by name

References

Former electoral districts of Queensland
1860 establishments in Australia
1873 disestablishments in Australia
Constituencies established in 1860
Constituencies disestablished in 1873